Ratu Siva Naulago (born 6 August 1991) is a Fijian professional rugby union footballer who plays as a winger for the Bristol Bears in the Gallagher Premiership Rugby. 

He previously played rugby league for Hull F.C. in the Betfred Super League.

Background
Naulago was born in Fiji.

Naulago is a Private in the Yorkshire Regiment and served in Cyprus for two years before being based in Warminster, Wiltshire, and playing rugby union as a 'guest player' for Bath Rugby and Saracens F.C. Sevens team, who he helped to the Premiership title.

Playing career

Rugby league
In 2019 he made his Super League debut for Hull F.C. against the Wigan Warriors.

Rugby union
In May 2020 it was announced that Naulago would switch codes and join rugby union side Bristol Bears ahead of the 2020–21 season.

References

External links
 
Hull FC profile
SL profile

1991 births
Living people
Bristol Bears players
Fijian rugby league players
Fijian rugby union players
Hull F.C. players
Rugby league wingers
Rugby union wings